Lindup is a surname. Notable people with the surname include:

David Lindup (1928–1992), English composer, arranger and orchestrator
Ernest Lindup, South African World War I flying ace
Janet Lindup, South African ballet dancer
Mike Lindup (born 1959), British musician

See also 
Lindup, British Columbia, Canada, a ghost town